Ivan Knežević (Cyrillic: Иван Кнежевић, born 22 February 1986) is a Montenegrin professional footballer who plays as a striker for Crvena Stijena.

Club career
In February 2010, Knežević signed a 3.5-year contract with FC Krasnodar.

On 28 January 2018, Knežević the Faroe Islands and joined Argja Bóltfelag. In the summer 2018, he then joined FK Otrant and played there until 18 January 2019, where he signed with Mladost Lješkopolje. Six months later, he signed with FK Dečić.

Honours
Club:
FK Zeta
Montenegrin First League: 2006-07

References

External links
 Profile at Sportbox.ru
 

1986 births
Living people
Footballers from Podgorica
Association football forwards
Serbia and Montenegro footballers
Montenegrin footballers
Montenegro under-21 international footballers
FK Zeta players
FC Krasnodar players
OFK Titograd players
FC Dacia Chișinău players
OFK Petrovac players
FK Rudar Pljevlja players
Ivan Knezevic
Argja Bóltfelag players
FK Podgorica players
FK Dečić players
First League of Serbia and Montenegro players
Montenegrin First League players
Russian First League players
Moldovan Super Liga players
Ivan Knezevic
1. deild players
Montenegrin Second League players
Montenegrin expatriate footballers
Expatriate footballers in Russia
Montenegrin expatriate sportspeople in Russia
Expatriate footballers in Moldova
Montenegrin expatriate sportspeople in Moldova
Expatriate footballers in Thailand
Montenegrin expatriate sportspeople in Thailand
Expatriate footballers in the Faroe Islands
Montenegrin expatriate sportspeople in the Faroe Islands